Jardim Helena-Vila Mara is a train station on CPTM Line 12-Sapphire, located in the district of Vila Curuçá, a few meters of the district of Jardim Helena (north side), being built to facilitate the access of passengers of both neighbourhoods, located in the city of São Paulo.

History
The station is part of a modernization project of Line 12-Sapphire and was opened on 28 May 2008 by CPTM to attend Jardim Helena, located on East Side of São Paulo.

References

Companhia Paulista de Trens Metropolitanos stations
Railway stations opened in 2008